Juan Mónaco was the defending champion, but lost in the first round to Agustín Calleri.

David Nalbandian won in the final 3–6, 7–6(7–5), 6–4, against José Acasuso. This was until 2021 the last time a tennis player from Argentina won the singles tournament, and it was also the last all-argentine final until 2021.

Seeds

Draw

Finals

Top half

Bottom half

External links
Main Draw
Qualifying draw

Singles